Porterfield is a surname of Scottish origin. It was first used by descendants of John de Porter in 1262. Notable people with the surname include:

 Alfred Porterfield (1869after 1894), Scottish football goalkeeper
 Bob Porterfield (192380), American Major League Baseball pitcher
 Christopher Porterfield (born before 2006), American songwriter, guitarist and singer
 Daniel R. Porterfield (born 1961), American academic administrator, 15th president of Franklin & Marshall College
 Eugene Porterfield (born 1946), American politician in Pennsylvania
 George A. Porterfield (18221919), American and Confederate army officer
 Gordon Porterfield (born before 1968), American playwright, novelist, poet and teacher
 Ian Porterfield (19462007), Scottish football player and coach
 John Porterfield, Scottish prelate
 Katherine Porterfield (born before 1998), American child psychologist
 Leslie Porterfield (born 1976), American female motorcyclist who has set several speed records
 Lewis B. Porterfield (18791942), American admiral
 Matthew Porterfield (born 1977), American independent filmmaker
 Robert Porterfield (190571), American founder of the Barter Theatre
 Ron Porterfield (born before 1983), American Major League Baseball athletic trainer
 Shaletta Porterfield (born 1985), American beauty queen
 William Porterfield (born 1984), Irish cricketer

See also 
 Porterfield (disambiguation)

References

Scottish surnames
Surnames of Scottish origin
Surnames of British Isles origin